= Save Urdu Movement =

Save Urdu Movement (Urdu: اردو بچاؤ تحریک) is a movement found in both India and Pakistan. In India, it is represented by the statewide units in different states of that country. In Pakistan, the movement is dedicated to ensure that Urdu is protected in Pakistan as its national language. It has especially argued for safeguarding Urdu education in schools.

== India ==
=== Save Urdu Movement and Indira Gandhi ===
Former Indian Prime Minister Indira Gandhi had a long and fruitful association with the representatives of the Save Urdu Movement. They had frequent access to her and she tried address some of their grievances related to Urdu in India.

=== Role of Save Urdu Movement in highlighting Problems of Urdu in India ===
This organisation has pointed out that partisan treatment is being meted out to Urdu language in many states of India. One such glaring example highlighted is that in spite of the status of official language in Uttar Pradesh, Urdu is now totally absent from government offices. There are now too few schools in the state where Urdu teaching has remained intact because Urdu teachers had not been inducted in for 14 years. All this information was furnished in a 2008 press statement issued by Irshad Ahmad, the general secretary of the state unit of ‘Urdu Bachao Tahreek’ (Save Urdu Movement) in Uttar Pradesh.

== Pakistan ==
=== Rift with the Sindh Government ===
This organisation particularly had a problematic time in Sindh where the provincial government tried to promote Sindhi over Urdu. One such scheme introduced by the Sindh Government of the Sindhi Salees scheme to promote Sindhi as a compulsory subject by slashing a 100-mark paper of Urdu taught to the students in Class XI. Save Urdu Movement argued that efforts should be made to teach Urdu and Sindhi to the students at schools in a meaningful way with a spirit to enable the students to understand significantly the language and its uses in the daily life, and the government should not try to impose Sindhi or Urdu teaching as a compulsory subject on the students at the intermediate level.
